The 2022–23 Coupe de France preliminary rounds, Méditerranée is the qualifying competition to decide which teams from the leagues of the Méditerranée region of France take part in the main competition from the seventh round.

A total of five teams will qualify from the Méditerranée preliminary rounds.

In 2021–22, AS Cannes progressed furthest in the competition, reaching the round of 32 by beating Ligue 2 side Dijon FCO, before losing narrowly to Toulouse FC from the same division.

Draws and fixtures
On 26 July 2022, the league published the first round draw, with 174 teams from the district leagues and Régional 2 entering at this stage. The second round draw was published on 23 August 2022, with the remaining 26 Regional level teams entering at this stage. The third round draw, which saw the entrance of the six teams from Championnat National 3 and the qualifying team from Saint-Pierre-et-Miquelon, took place live on Facebook on 31 August 2022. The fourth round draw, which saw the six teams from Championnat National 2 enter the competition, also tool place live on Facebook on 15 September 2022.

The fifth round draw, which saw the entry of the team from Championnat National, was published on 7 October 2022. The sixth round draw was published on 10 October 2022.

First round
These matches were played on 19 and 20 August 2022.

Second round
These matches were played on 28 August 2022.

Third round
These matches were played on 10 and 11 September 2022.

Fourth round
These matches were played on 24 and 25 September 2022.

Fifth round
These matches were played on 8 and 9 October 2022.

Sixth round
These matches were played on 15 and 16 October 2022.

References

Preliminary rounds